Scott Hastings Beckett (October 4, 1929 – May 10, 1968) was an American actor. He began his career as a child actor in the Our Gang shorts and later costarred on Rocky Jones, Space Ranger.

Early life and career
 
Born in Oakland, California, Beckett got his start in show business at age three when the family moved to Los Angeles and a casting director heard him singing by chance. He was at Cedars of Lebanon Hospital visiting his father, who was recovering from an illness, and was entertaining him by singing songs in Pig Latin. Nurses heard him singing and carried him from room to room on every visit to sing for other patients. A studio casting director noticed the child and told his parents he had movie potential. He auditioned, and landed a part in Gallant Lady (1933), alongside Dickie Moore. The same year, his father died. In 1934, he joined Our Gang, in which Moore had appeared from 1932 to 1933.

Our Gang
Beckett appeared as a regular in the Our Gang short subjects series from 1934 to 1935. In it, he played George "Spanky" McFarland's best friend and partner in mischief. His trademark look was a crooked baseball cap and an oversized sweater exposing one shoulder. His role was taken over by Carl "Alfalfa" Switzer in 1935, and he left the series for features after that year. In 1939, he returned briefly as Alfalfa's cousin, Wilbur, in Cousin Wilbur and Dog Daze.

Career after Our Gang

After his Our Gang tenure ended, Beckett won increasingly prominent roles in major Hollywood films, usually playing the star's son or the hero as a boy. Among his major credits are Dante's Inferno with Spencer Tracy, Anthony Adverse with Fredric March, The Charge of the Light Brigade with Errol Flynn, Conquest with Greta Garbo, Marie Antoinette with Norma Shearer; Ali Baba and the Forty Thieves, in which he played Jon Hall's character as a child, and Kings Row, in which he played Robert Cummings's character as a child. In 1940, he played Tim in My Favorite Wife, starring Cary Grant and Irene Dunne. He appeared as one of the unborn children in Shirley Temple's The Blue Bird (1940). He also had a central role in the wartime propaganda film The Boy from Stalingrad (1943).

Beckett attended Los Angeles High School and took time off from filming to try his luck on the stage. Adolescence did not hamper his career, as he won important roles as that of young Al Jolson in The Jolson Story, with his singing voice provided by Rudy Wissler, and Junior in the radio show The Life of Riley. His performance as Jolson was described as "touching, enchanting, and to all indications, accurate". In 1947, he appeared alongside former Our Gang member Dickie Moore and Marilyn Monroe in Dangerous Years.

Beckett was signed by MGM in 1947, with his first role under contract as Will Parker in Cynthia. He gained the role of Oogie Pringle in A Date with Judy, the film adaptation of the radio series of the same name, opposite Jane Powell as Judy Foster. In 1949, he was featured in the war drama Battleground and the following year he starred as the fast-talking Tennessee Shad in the comedy The Happy Years.  By 1950, the success of those three films resulted in expectations that his career would rise. Unfortunately, while other actors his age moved into leading roles, his career declined, as evidenced by his small role in Nancy Goes to Rio, again with Powell.

Beckett attended the University of Southern California, but dropped out when the combined workload of school and films became too great. Although he was working steadily at MGM, his life grew increasingly tumultuous in the late 1940s and early 1950s. In 1948, he was arrested on suspicion of drunk driving.

In 1954, Beckett's career took an upward turn when he was cast as Winky, the comic sidekick in the popular TV show Rocky Jones, Space Ranger. However, he was fired from the series after being arrested on a concealed weapons charge and for passing a bad check. According to actor Jimmy Lydon, who appeared with him in the Gasoline Alley films and also replaced him after he was fired from Rocky Jones, he earned a bad reputation due to his excessive drinking. Lydon also claimed that he made many enemies because he gambled frequently but refused to pay his gambling debts or repay money that was lent to him.  After being fired from Rocky Jones, he made only a few subsequent TV and film appearances, some uncredited bit parts, before leaving show business forever.

Post-acting life
After leaving the entertainment industry, Beckett sold real estate, cars, and twice enrolled at universities with the intention of becoming a physician. He was also arrested several times for drunkenness, drunk driving, drug possession, and passing bad checks. His first arrest for drunk driving came in 1948, followed by a second arrest in March 1959.  In February 1957, he was arrested after attempting to cross the Mexican border with 250 "stimulant pills". On August 14, 1959, he was arrested for possessing four Benzedrine pills. He was released after twelve hours after the county prosecutor refused to press charges. Four days later, at age 29, he sustained a broken hip and skull fracture after crashing his car into a tree while driving in West Los Angeles. Lydon claimed that the accident left Beckett severely disabled and he had to utilize a wheelchair and crutches for the remainder of his life. In 1962, he attempted suicide after a heavy drinking binge.

Personal life
Beckett was married three times and had one child. He married professional tennis player Beverly Baker on September 28, 1949, in Las Vegas. She was granted a divorce in June 1950.  His second marriage was to model and actress Sunny Vickers. They married in 1951 and had one son, Scott Jr., before divorcing in 1957. In 1961, he married Margaret C. Sabo; she remained with him until his death.

Death
On May 8, 1968, Beckett checked into a Los Angeles nursing home to seek medical attention after suffering a serious beating (the circumstances surrounding it were never made clear). He was found dead in his room on May 10. He was 38 years old. A note and pills were found, but the Los Angeles County coroner stated that an exact cause of death was unknown even though an autopsy had been performed.  While no official cause of death has been listed, various media reports state that he overdosed on either barbiturates or alcohol.

Beckett is buried at San Fernando Mission Cemetery in Mission Hills, Los Angeles.

Filmography

Short subjects

Sailor Made Widow (1934)
Hi'-Neighbor! (1934) as Scotty
For Pete's Sake! (1934) as Scotty
The First Round-Up (1934) as Scotty
Honky Donkey (1934) as Scotty
Mike Fright (1934) as Scotty
Washee Ironee (1934) as Scotty
Mama's Little Pirate (1934) as Scotty
Shrimps for a Day (1934) as Scotty 
Anniversary Trouble (1935) as Scotty
Beginner's Luck (1935) as Scotty
Teacher's Beau (1935) as Scotty
Sprucin' Up (1935) as Scotty 
Little Papa (1935) as Scotty 
Our Gang Follies of 1936 (1935) as Scotty
The Lucky Corner (1936) as Scotty 
M-G-M Miniature: Little Boy Blue (1936) as The Boy
The King Without a Crown (1937) as King Louis XVII, the Dauphin (uncredited)
Cousin Wilbur (1939) as Wilbur Nesbitt Newcome II
Dog Daze (1939) as Wilbur 
The Royal Rodeo (1939) as The King
Cinderella's Feller (1940) as The Young Prince
The Flag of Humanity (1940) as Johnny Wilson (uncredited)

Films

Gallant Lady (1933) as Deedy - Age 2 (film debut, uncredited)
I Am Suzanne (1933) as Child in Hospital (uncredited)
George White's Scandals (1934) as Child (uncredited)
Stand Up and Cheer! (1934) as Boy Auditioning for Miss Adams (uncredited)
Whom the Gods Destroy (1934) as Jack Forrester, Age 4
Romance in the Rain (1934) as Child Specialty
Babes in Toyland (1934) as Schoolboy (uncredited)
Sailor Made Widow (1934)
Dante's Inferno (1935) as Alexander Carter
Pursuit (1935) as Donald McCoy 'Donny' Smith
I Dream Too Much (1935) as Boy on Carousel
The Case Against Mrs. Ames (1936) as Bobbie Ames
Anthony Adverse (1936) as Anthony's Son
Old Hutch (1936) as Roy Hutchins (uncredited)
The Charge of the Light Brigade (1936) as Prema Singh
When You're in Love (1937) as Little Boy with Whistle (uncredited)
A Doctor's Diary (1937) as Billy (uncredited)
Slave Ship (1937) as Boy (uncredited)
It Happened in Hollywood (1937) as Boy (uncredited)
Life Begins with Love (1937) as Young Boy
Conquest (1937) as Alexandre Walewska (uncredited)
Wells Fargo (1937) as Young Nick Pryor (uncredited)
The Bad Man of Brimstone (1937) as Sammy Grant (uncredited)
No Time to Marry (1938) as Junior
The Devil's Party (1938) as Mike O'Mara as a Child (uncredited)
Marie Antoinette (1938) as The Dauphin
Smashing the Rackets (1938) as Franz's Boy (uncredited)
Listen, Darling (1938) as Billie Wingate
Love Affair (1939) as Boy on Ship (uncredited)
The Flying Irishman (1939) as Henry Corrigan - 7 Years Old (uncredited)
Blind Alley (1939) as Davy
Mickey the Kid (1939) as Bobby
The Escape (1939) as Willie Rogers
Our Neighbors – The Carters (1939) as Dickie Carter
Days of Jesse James (1939) as Buster Samuels
The Blue Bird (1940) as Child
My Son, My Son! (1940) as Oliver as a Child
My Favorite Wife (1940) as Tim - the Ardens' Son
Gold Rush Maisie (1940) as Harold Davis
Street of Memories (1940) as Tommy Foster
Father's Son (1941) as Danny (uncredited)
Aloma of the South Seas (1941) as Tanoa as a Child
The Vanishing Virginian (1942) as Joel Yancey
Kings Row (1942) as Parris Mitchell - as a Boy
It Happened in Flatbush (1942) as Squint
Between Us Girls (1942) as Little Prince Leopold
The Youngest Profession (1943) as Junior Lyons
The Boy from Stalingrad (1943) as Pavel
Good Luck, Mr. Yates (1943) as Jimmy Dixon
Heaven Can Wait (1943) as Henry Van Cleve - Age 9 (uncredited)
Ali Baba and the Forty Thieves (1944) as Ali Baba as a Child
The Climax (1944) as The King
Circumstantial Evidence (1945) as Freddy Hanlon
Junior Miss (1945) as Haskell Cummings Jr.
My Reputation (1946) as Kim Drummond
Her Adventurous Night (1946) as Junior Fry
White Tie and Tails (1946) as Bill Latimer
The Jolson Story (1946) as Asa Yoelson / Al Jolson, as a boy
Cynthia (1947) as Will Parker
Dangerous Years (1947) as Willy Miller
A Date with Judy (1948) as Ogden 'Oogie' Pringle
Michael O'Halloran (1948) as Michael O'Halloran
Any Number Can Play (1949) as Paul Kyng as a Boy, in Photo (uncredited)
Battleground (1949) as William J. Hooper
Life of St. Paul Series (1949) as Jacob
Nancy Goes to Rio (1950) as Scotty Sheldan
Louisa (1950) as Jimmy Blake
The Happy Years (1950) as 'Tennessee' Shad
Gasoline Alley (1951) as Corky
Corky of Gasoline Alley (1951) as Corky Wallet
Hot News (1953) as Bill Burton
The High and the Mighty (1954) as Coast Guard Navigator (uncredited)
Three for Jamie Dawn (1956) as Gordon Peters
Public Pigeon No. 1 (1957) as Photographer (uncredited)
The Oklahoman (1957) as Messenger at Ranch (uncredited)
Monkey on My Back (1957) as Corpsman (final film, uncredited)

References

Further reading
 Holmstrom, John. The Moving Picture Boy: An International Encyclopaedia from 1895 to 1995, Norwich, Michael Russell, 1996, pp. 166–167.
 Dye, David. Child and Youth Actors: Filmography of Their Entire Careers, 1914-1985. Jefferson, NC: McFarland & Co., 1988, pp. 14–15.

External links

 
 
 
 
 

20th-century American male actors
American male child actors
American male film actors
American male television actors
American male stage actors
American male radio actors
Metro-Goldwyn-Mayer contract players
University of Southern California alumni
Burials at San Fernando Mission Cemetery
Drug-related suicides in California
Male actors from Oakland, California
Hal Roach Studios actors
Our Gang
1929 births
1968 suicides
Alcohol-related deaths in California
1968 deaths